Plateau of Fear is a British science-fiction television drama series which aired in a six parts on ITV in 1961. A British journalist investigates as a series of attacks on a nuclear power station, located in the Andes in South America, which he comes to believe may have been caused by some giant beast.

Cast
 Gerald Flood as Mark Bannerman
 John Barron as Dr. Miguel Aranda 
 Ferdy Mayne as General Villagran
 Richard Coleman as Ralph Morton
 Stewart Guidotti as  Peter Blake
 Jan Miller as Dr. Susan Fraser
 Peter Allenby as Lorca
 Maureen Lindholm as Julietta Aranda
 Roger Delgado as General Perera

References

Bibliography
Ellen Baskin. Serials on British Television, 1950-1994. Scolar Press, 1996.

External links
 

ITV television dramas
1961 British television series debuts
1961 British television series endings
English-language television shows
Television shows produced by ABC Weekend TV